James Roberts (born 1878) was a Welsh footballer who played at both professional and international levels.

Career
Roberts played for Bradford City between 1905 and 1908, making 24 appearances in the English Football League; he was also Bradford's first international player.

Roberts earned international caps for Wales, earning two caps in 1906 and 1907.

References

1878 births
Year of death missing
Welsh footballers
Wales international footballers
Bradford City A.F.C. players
English Football League players
Association footballers not categorized by position